This is a list of women's professional wrestling promotions in the United States, both active and defunct women's promotions from the 1950s through the present.

See also

List of women's wrestling promotions

References

Women
United States
Professional wrestling-related lists
Wrestling Promotions In The United States